Col. Robert C. Miller, USAF (1920–1998), was an American meteorologist, who pioneered severe convective storms forecasting and applied research, developing an empirical forecasting method, identifying many features associated with severe thunderstorms, a forecast checklist and manuals, and is known for the first official tornado forecast (1948 Tinker Air Force Base tornadoes), and it verified, in 1948.

References

External links 
 Golden Anniversary of Tornado Forecasting (National Severe Storms Laboratory)
 The Historic Forecast (National Weather Service, Norman, OK)
 1948 prediction spurs tornado forecasting (USA Today)

American meteorologists
1920 births
1998 deaths